Product Control is a control and support function, responsible for ensuring accurate financial reporting for trading, lending and treasury desks. The function is typically located within investment banking, corporate treasuries, hedge funds and more recently, crypto trading firms.
Given the responsibility for the financials, outlined below, Product Control is most commonly located within the Finance function, reporting into the CFO. The controllers are then assigned to a particular asset class, for example the Credit, Rates or FX desks

Product Control produces the daily profit and loss ("P&L") and balance sheet, which internal stakeholders (like the business, financial control, management reporting) all rely upon to assess the performance of the business.
These results also make their way outside the organisation and are consumed by regulators - such as the Federal Reserve or the European Central Bank.
Product Control also assists the business with the onboarding of new products. They do this by ensuring the financial architecture and control framework can accept and process the new products. 
Within or outside Product Control can be a Valuations team, responsible for ensuring the balance sheet is aligned to the accounting definition of fair value. If the regulator requires it, Valuations also govern prudential valuation.

There are numerous controls this function executes. 
Each day, the P&L is decomposed into its underlying components; see PnL Explained.
New and amended trades are analysed to ensure the trades are OK to be reported (i.e. genuine and measured appropriately). P&L from existing positions is attributed into its underlying pricing drivers (P&L attribution). This will include risk-based P&L explains. Funding charges or benefits are reviewed as are any fees and valuation adjustments. Once completed, the controller has a complete picture of the P&L result and will explain the drivers in a P&L commentary, which accompanies the P&L report. The business will need to approve the P&L, which implies material differences to a trader flash has been resolved.  

There have been high-profile cases in which banks have been fined for this control not working effectively, examples including the USA's financial services regulator, the Securities and Exchange Commission, fining European investment bank Credit Suisse over mismarking bonds during the height of the subprime credit crisis.
Poor product control procedure was also noted in the collapse of several US investment banks Lehman Brothers.

References

Financial markets
Financial risk